Shaiva Siddhanta (Tamil: சைவ சித்தாந்தம் "Caiva cittāntam") is a form of Shaivism popular in South India and Sri Lanka which propounds a devotional philosophy with the ultimate goal of experiencing union with Shiva. It draws primarily on the Tamil devotional hymns written by Shaiva saints from the 5th to the 9th century, known in their collected form as Tirumurai. Meykandadevar (13th century) was the first systematic philosopher of the school.
The normative rites, cosmology and theology of Shaiva Siddhanta draw upon a combination of Agamas and Vedic scriptures.

This tradition is thought to have been once practiced all over India. However the Muslim subjugation of North India restricted Shaiva Siddhanta to the south, where it merged with the Tamil Saiva movement expressed in the bhakti poetry of the Nayanmars. It is in this historical context that Shaiva Siddhanta is commonly considered a "southern" tradition, one that is still very much alive. The Tamil compendium of devotional songs known as Tirumurai, the Shaiva Agamas and "Meykanda" or "Siddhanta" Shastras, form the scriptural canon of Tamil Shaiva Siddhanta.

Today, Shaiva Siddhanta has adherents predominantly in South India and Sri Lanka.

Etymology

Monier-Williams gives the meaning of siddhanta as ‘any fixed or established or canonical text-book or received scientific treatise on any subject ... as .. Brahma-siddhanta ब्रह्म-सिद्धान्त,... Surya-siddhanta, etc.’  The name of the school could be translated as "the settled view of Shaiva doctrine" or "perfected Shaivism."

History

Shaiva Siddhanta's original form is uncertain. Some hold that it originated as a monistic doctrine, espoused by Kashmiri northern shaivites (date unknown). South India is another theorized location of origin, where it was most prevalent. It seems likely to others, however, that the early Śaiva Siddhānta may have developed somewhere in  India, as a religion built around the notion of a ritual initiation that conferred liberation. Such a notion of liberatory initiation appears to have been borrowed from a Pashupata (pāśupata) tradition. At the time of the early development of the theology of the school, the question of monism or dualism, which became so central to later theological debates, had not yet emerged as an important issue.

Ontological Categories 
Shaiva Siddhanta believes in three different categories, which are distinct from each other:

 pati ("Lord"), is Siva himself and cause of emission, maintenance, re-absorption, concealment and grace.
 pasu ("Soul"), is individual Soul, distinct from Siva, but bound because of impurities.
 pasa ("Bond"), the three impurities - anava (darkness), karma (deed) and maya (delusion).
The soul gains experience through its action (rituals), which removes the three impurities, but the liberation is realized only by the grace of Lord Siva.

Four stages 
According to Shaiva Siddhanta texts, there are four progressive stages of Siva bhaki for a path to attain moksha:

 dāsamārga, offering service to devotees of Siva in different ways such as cleaning temple, weaving flower garlands for the image of Siva, praising Lord Siva.
 satputramārga, a true son's way, offering personal devotion by preparing pūjā and performing meditation. 
 sahamārga, offering devotion by practicing yoga.
 sanmārga, the way of truth and reality and the highest way, offering devotion by knowledge of God, experiencing the bliss of liberation and becoming one with God.

Tamil bhakti

From the fifth to the eighth century CE Buddhism and Jainism had spread in Tamil Nadu before a forceful Shaiva bhakti movement arose. Between the seventh and ninth centuries, pilgrim saints such as Sambandar, Appar, Sundarar 63 nayanmars used songs of Shiva's greatness to refute concepts of Buddhism and Jainism. Manikkavacakar's verses, called Tiruvacakam, are full of visionary experience, divine love and urgent striving for truth. The songs of these four saints are part of the compendium known as Tirumurai which, along with the Vedas, Shaiva Agamas, and the Meykanda Shastras, are now considered to form the scriptural basis of the Śaiva Siddhānta in Tamil Nadu. It seems probable that the Tirumurai devotional literature was not, however, considered to belong to the Śaiva Siddhānta canon at the time when it was first composed: the hymns themselves appear to make no such claim for themselves.

The Bhakti movement should not be exaggerated as an articulation of a 'class struggle'; there is nevertheless a strong sense against rigid structures in the society.

But it must also be considered that the public figures in the Saiva Siddhanta, are people living in a community faced with strong nationalist ideas. In that way their beliefs in a religious way and their beliefs in a political way were mostly intertwined. Maraimalai Adigal and his religious belief in the Saiva Siddhanta, for example, were heavily influenced by the Tamil Nationalism and especially by the party of the Shivaistic Revivalist, which he and his mentor had a part in creating. In Adigals belief system you can see how the Saiva Siddhanta that he relies his core beliefs on is mixed with his and the Revivalists core political to a very an individual tamilic Saiva Siddhanta Tradition. For example, though the Saiva Siddhanta in itself isn’t anti-brahmanic Adigal develop it into having that tendency. That way his religious teaching in the Saiva Siddhanta strengthens his pro-tamil and pro-shivaism attitude. It helps him and the Revivalists to establish their idea of the “pure Tamil”, by becoming a religious tradition not reliant on any ties to older traditions by becoming itself the oldest tradition.

Integration

In the twelfth century, Aghorasiva, the head of a branch monastery of the Amardaka order in Chidambaram, took up the task of amalgamating  Sanskrit and Tamil Siddhanta. Strongly refuting monist interpretations of Siddhanta, Aghorasiva brought a change in the understanding of Siva by reclassifying the first five principles, or tattvas (Nada, Bindu, Sadasiva, Isvara and Suddhavidya), into the category of pasa (bonds), stating they were effects of a cause and inherently unconscious substances, a departure from the traditional teaching in which these five were part of the divine nature of God.

Aghorasiva was successful in preserving the Sanskrit rituals of the ancient Āgamic tradition. To this day, Aghorasiva's Siddhanta philosophy is followed by almost all of the hereditary temple priests (Sivacharya), and his texts on the Āgamas have become the standard puja manuals. His Kriyakramadyotika is a vast work covering nearly all aspects of Shaiva Siddhanta ritual, including the daily worship of Siva, occasional rituals, initiation rites, funerary rites, and festivals.

In Tamil Shaiva Siddhanta, the thirteenth century Meykandar, Arulnandi Sivacharya, and Umapati Sivacharya further spread Tamil Shaiva Siddhanta. Meykandar's twelve-verse Śivajñānabodham and subsequent works by other writers, all supposedly of the thirteenth and fourteenth centuries, laid the foundation of the Meykandar Sampradaya (lineage), which propounds a pluralistic realism wherein God, souls and world are coexistent and without beginning. Siva is an efficient but not material cause. They view the soul's merging in Siva as salt in water, an eternal oneness that is also twoness.

Saiva Siddhanta today
Saiva Siddhanta is practiced widely among the Saivas of southern India and Sri Lanka, especially by members of the Brahmins, Kongu Vellalar, Vellalar and Nagarathar communities of South India. It has over 5 million followers in Tamil Nadu, and is also prevalent among the Tamil diaspora around the world. It has thousands of active temples predominantly in Tamil Nadu and also in places around the world with significant tamil population  and also has numerous monastic and ascetic traditions, along with its own community of priests, the Adishaivas, who are qualified to perform Agama-based Shaiva Temple rituals.

Kumaragurupara Desikar, a Tamil Saivite poet says that Shaiva Siddhantha is the ripe fruit of the Vedanta tree. G.U. Pope, an Anglican Tamil Scholar, mentions that Shaiva Sidhantha is the best expression of Dravidian knowledge.

Theology

Texts
The texts revered by the southern Saiva Siddhanta are the Vedas; the twenty-eight dualist Hindu Agamas, which form the ritual basis of the tradition; the twelve books of the Tamil Saiva canon called the Tirumurai, which contains the poetry of the Nayanars; and the Saiva Siddhanta Shastras.

Early theology
Siddhas such as Sadyojyoti (ca seventh century) are credited with the systematization of the Siddhanta theology in Sanskrit. Sadyojyoti, initiated by the guru Ugrajyoti, propounded the Siddhanta philosophical views as found in the Rauravatantra and Svāyambhuvasūtrasaṅgraha. He may or may not have been from Kashmir, but the next thinkers whose works survive were those of a Kashmirian lineage active in the tenth century: Rāmakaṇṭha I, Vidyākaṇṭha I, Śrīkaṇṭha, Nārāyaṇakaṇṭha, Rāmakaṇṭha II, Vidyākaṇṭha II. Treatises by the last four of these survive. King Bhoja of Gujarat (ca 1018) condensed the massive body of Siddhanta scriptural texts into one concise metaphysical treatise called the Tattvaprakāśa.

Later theology
The culmination of a long period of systematisation of its theology appears to have taken place in Kashmir in the tenth century, the exegetical works of the Kashmirian authors Bhatta Narayanakantha and Bhatta Ramakantha being the most sophisticated expressions of this school of thought.  Their works were quoted and emulated in the works of twelfth-century South Indian authors, such as Aghorasiva and Trilocanasiva.  The theology they expound is based on a canon of Tantric scriptures called Siddhantatantras or Shaiva Agamas.  This canon is traditionally held to contain twenty-eight scriptures, but the lists vary, and several doctrinally significant scriptures, such as the Mrgendra, are not listed. In the systematisation of the ritual of the Shaiva Siddhanta, the Kashmirian thinkers appear to have exercised less influence: the treatise that had the greatest impact on Shaiva ritual, and indeed on ritual outside the Shaiva sectarian domain, for we find traces of it in such works as the Agnipurana, is a ritual manual composed in North India in the late eleventh century by a certain Somasambhu.

Monastic orders

Three monastic orders were instrumental in Shaiva Siddhanta's diffusion through India; the Amardaka order, identified with one of Shaivism's holiest cities, Ujjain, the Mattamayura order, in the capital of the Chalukya dynasty, and the Madhumateya order of Central India. Each developed numerous sub-orders. (see Nandinatha Sampradaya) Siddhanta monastics used the influence of royal patrons to propagate the teachings in neighboring kingdoms, particularly in South India. From Mattamayura, they established monasteries in regions now in Maharashtra, Karnataka, Andhra and Kerala.

References

Sources

External links
 Southern Schools of Śaivism, by Surendranath Dasgupta
 Siddha Saivism - Philosophy and Practices
 Studies in Saiva-siddhanta, J.M. Nallaswami Pillai, 1911
 K. Ganesalingam, Notes on Saiva Siddhanta Philosophy
 Oxford Bibliographies, Saiva Siddhanta
 ŚANKARA - SIVAISM IN SOUTHERN INDIA - KASHMIR - LINGÂYATS
 Excellent discussion on latest research with 2 leading scholors
 Jangam Lingayat

Shaiva sects
Bhakti movement
Hindu tantra
Theistic Indian philosophy
Tamil philosophy